Walter Birch may refer to

Walter de Gray Birch (1842–1924), English Historian
Walter Birch (1898–1965), British bobsledder
Walter Birch (footballer) (1917–1991), English footballer